This is a list of historical forts in the United States. World War II military reservations containing 8-inch and larger gun batteries are also included.

Alabama

Fort Armstrong
Fort Bibb
Fort Bowyer
Fort Carney
Fort Claiborne
Fort Condé, open to the public
Fort Crawford
Fort Dale
Fort Decatur
Fort Easley
Fort Gaines
Fort Glass
Fort Hampton
Fort Harker
Fort Hull
Fort Jackson, open to the public
Fort Landrum
Fort Leslie
Fort Likens
Fort Madison
Fort McClellan
Fort Montgomery
Fort Morgan, open to the public
Fort Rucker, closed to the public
Fort Sinquefield
Fort Stoddert
Fort Strother
Fort Tombecbe, open to the public
Fort Toulouse, open to the public
Fort Williams, destroyed by erosion

Alaska

Fort Abercrombie, open to the public
Fort Brumback
Fort Learnard
Fort Davis
Fort Greely, closed to the public
Fort Egbert
Fort Gibbon
Fort Learnard
Fort McGilvray
Fort Mears
Fort Randall, closed to the public
Fort Raymond
Fort Richardson, closed to the public
Fort Rousseau
Fort Schwatka
Fort William H. Seward
Fort St. Michael
Fort St. Nicholas
Fort Tongass
Fort Wainwright, closed to the public

Arizona

Fort Apache, open to the public
Fort Bowie, open to the public
Fort Buchanan
Fort Crittenden
Fort Defiance
Fort Grant, closed to the public
Fort Huachuca, closed to the public
Fort Lowell, open to the public
Fort Mojave
Fort Tyson
Fort Verde, open to the public
Fort Whipple, open to the public

Arkansas

Fort Carlos III, destroyed by erosion
Fort Chaffee, closed to the public
Fort Curtis, open to the public
Fort Logan H. Roots, open to the public
Fort Lookout, open to the public
Fort Smith, open to the public

California

Colorado

Connecticut

Fort Griswold, open to the public
Fort Nathan Hale, open to the public
Fort Trumbull, open to the public
Fort Stamford, open to the public

Delaware

Fort Casimir, destroyed
Fort Christina, open to the public
Fort Delaware, open to the public
Fort du Pont, open to the public
Fort Miles, open to the public
Fort Saulsbury, closed to the public

Florida

Georgia

Fort Benning, closed to the public
Fort Gordon, closed to the public
Fort Frederica, open to the public
Fort Gillem
Fort Hawkins, open to the public
Fort James Jackson, open to the public
Fort King George, open to the public
Fort McAllister, open to the public
Fort McPherson
Fort Pulaski, open to the public
Fort Scott
Fort Stewart, closed to the public

Hawaii

Fort Armstrong
Fort DeRussy, closed to the public
Fort Hase, closed to the public
Fort Kamehameha
Fort Elizabeth, open to the public
Fort Ruger, open to the public
Schofield Barracks, closed to the public
Fort Shafter, closed to the public

Idaho

Fort Boise
Camp Connor
Fort Hall, open to the public
Fort Lapwai, open to the public
Fort Sherman, open to the public

Illinois

Fort Armstrong
Fort de Chartres
Fort Dearborn
Fort Johnson
Fort Kaskaskia
Fort Massac
Fort Sheridan

Indiana

Fort Benjamin Harrison, open to the public
Fort Patrick Henry, abandoned
Fort Knox, abandoned
Fort Wayne, open to the public

Iowa

Fort Atkinson, open to the public

Kansas

Fort Atkinson
Fort Aubrey
Fort Bain
Fort Belmont  
Fort Blair
Fort Brooks
Burlingame's Fort
Fort de Cavagnial
Fort Clifton
Fort Dodge
Fort Drinkwater
Fort Ellsworth
Fort Harker, open to the public
Fort Hays
Fort Henning
Fort Insley
Fort Lane
Fort Larned, open to the public
Fort Leavenworth, closed to the public
Fort Lincoln
Fort Lookout
Fort Mann
Fort McKean
Fort Montgomery (1855)
Fort Montgomery (1861)
Fort Riley, closed to the public
Fort Row
Fort Saunders
Fort Scott, open to the public
Fort Simple
Fort Solomon
Fort Sully
Fort Titus
Fort Wakarusa
Fort Wallace
Fort Zarah

Kentucky

Fort Boonesborough, open to the public
Fort Campbell, closed to the public
Fort Harrod, open to the public
Fort Knox, closed to the public
Fort Nelson
Fort William

Louisiana

Fort Jackson
Fort Livingston
Fort Macomb
Fort Pike
Fort Polk, closed to the public
Fort Proctor
Fort St. Philip

Maine

Fort Baldwin, open to the public
Fort Edgecomb, open to the public
Fort Foster, open to the public
Fort George, open to the public
Fort Gorges, open to the public
Fort Halifax, open to the public
Fort Kent, open to the public
Fort Knox, open to the public
Fort Levett, closed to the public
Fort Lyon, closed to the public
Fort McClary, open to the public
Fort McKinley, closed to the public
Fort O'Brien, open to the public
Fort Pentagouet
Fort Popham, open to the public
Fort Preble, open to the public
Fort Scammel, closed to the public
Fort Sullivan, open to the public
Fort Sumner, open to the public
Fort Williams, open to the public
Fort William Henry, open to the public

Maryland

Fort Armistead, open to the public
Fort Carroll, closed to the public
Fort Cumberland, demolished
Fort Defiance, open to the public
Fort Detrick, closed to the public
Fort Foote, open to the public
Fort Frederick, open to the public
Fort George G. Meade, closed to the public
Fort Howard, open to the public
Fort McHenry, open to the public
Fort Severn, demolished
Fort Smallwood, open to the public
Fort Washington, open to the public

Massachusetts
Acushnet Fort
Fort Andrew
Fort Andrews
Fort Banks
Fort Dawes
Fort Defiance
Fort Devens
Fort Duvall
East Point Military Reservation
Eastern Point Fort
Fort Heath
Fort Independence, open to the public
Long Point Battery
Fort Miller
Fort Phoenix
Fort Pickering
Fort Revere
Fort Rodman
Fort Ruckman
Fort Sewall
Stage Fort
Fort Standish (Boston)
Fort Standish (Plymouth)
Fort Strong
Fort Taber
Fort Warren, open to the public
Fort Washington
Fort Winthrop

Michigan

Fort de Buade
Fort Detroit
Fort Holmes
Fort Mackinac
Fort Miami
Fort Michilimackinac
Fort St. Joseph (Niles)
Fort St. Joseph (Port Huron), rebuilt as Fort Gratiot
Fort Wayne (Detroit)
Fort Wilkins

Minnesota
Fort Beauharnois
Fort Duquesne
Fort L'Huillier
Fort Ridgely
Fort Ripley
Fort St. Charles
Fort Snelling

Mississippi
Fort Massachusetts
Fort Maurepas

Missouri

Fort Belle Fontaine, open to the public
Fort Cap au Gris
Fort Crowder
Fort Leonard Wood, closed to the public
Fort Osage, open to the public
Jefferson Barracks, open to the public

Montana

Fort Assinniboine
Fort C. F. Smith
Fort Ellis
Fort Keogh
Fort Parker
Fort William Henry Harrison
Fort Missoula
Fort Benton

Nebraska

Fort Atkinson, open to the public
Fort Hartsuff, open to the public
Fort Kearny, open to the public
Fort Lisa
Fort McPherson, open to the public
Fort Mitchell
Fort Niobrara
Fort Omaha
Fort Robinson, open to the public
Fort Sidney, open to the public

Nevada

Fort Churchill, open to the public

New Hampshire
Fort Constitution, open to the public
Fort at Number 4, open to the public
Fort Dearborn
Fort Stark
Fort Washington
Fort Wentworth
Fort William and Mary

New Jersey
Fort Billingsport
Cape May Military Reservation
Fort Dix
Highlands Military Reservation
Fort Lee
Fort Hancock
Fort Mercer
Fort Monmouth
Fort Mott
Fortifications of New Netherland
Fort Nonsense

New Mexico
Fort Bascom
Fort Bayard
Fort Craig
Fort Cummings
Fort Fillmore
Fort Marcy
Fort McRae
Fort Selden
Fort Stanton
Fort Sumner
Fort Thorn
Fort Tularosa
Fort Union
Fort Wingate

New York
Fort Amsterdam
Castle Clinton
Fort Clinton
Fort Columbus
Fort Crown Point
Fort Drum
Fort Edward
Fort Gansevoort
Fort Gibson
Fort Greene
Fort Hamilton
Camp Hero
Fort Jay
Fort Lafayette
Fort Lévis
Madison Barracks
Fort Michie
Fort Montgomery (1776)
Fort Montgomery (1844)
Forts of New Netherland
Fort Niagara
Fort Ontario
Fort de La Présentation
Fort Schuyler
Fort Slocum
Fort Stanwix, open to the public
Fort Terry
Fort Ticonderoga
Fort Tilden
Fort Tompkins (1812)
Fort Tompkins (1812)
Fort Tompkins (1814)
Fort Tompkins (1847)
Fort Totten
Fort Tyler
Fort Wadsworth
Fort Washington
Battery Weed
Fort William Henry
Castle Williams
Fort Wood
Fort H. G. Wright

North Carolina

Fort Anderson, open to the public
Fort Bragg, closed to the public
Fort Caswell, closed to the public
Fort Dobbs, open to the public
Fort Fisher, open to the public
Fort Greene
Fort Hampton, open to the public
Fort Johnston, open to the public
Fort Macon, open to the public

North Dakota
Fort Abercrombie
Fort Abraham Lincoln
Fort Buford
Fort Clark
Fort Mandan
Fort Ransom
Fort Rice
Fort Stevenson
Fort Totten
Fort Union

Ohio

Fort Defiance, open to the public
Fort Deposit
Fort Findlay
Fort Frye
Fort Harmar
Fort Hayes
Fort Jefferson
Fort Laurens, open to the public
Fort Meigs, open to the public
Fort Miamis
Fort Recovery, open to the public
Fort St. Clair
Fort Sandoské (1750)
Fort Sandusky (1761)
Fort Stephenson
Fort Steuben, open to the public
Fort Washington

Oklahoma
Fort Arbuckle
Fort Cobb
Fort Coffee
Fort Gibson
Camp Gruber
Fort McCulloch
Fort Nichols
Fort Reno
Fort Sill
Fort Supply
Fort Towson
Fort Washita
Fort Wayne

Oregon
Fort Astoria
Fort Clatsop
Fort Dalles
Fort Hoskins
Fort Klamath
Fort Lane
Fort Stevens
Fort William
Fort Yamhill

Pennsylvania

Fort Augusta
Fort Bedford
Fort Duquesne
Fort Granville
Fort Halifax
Fort Hunter
Fort Jones
Fort Laughlin
Fort Le Boeuf
Fort Ligonier
Fort Machault
Fort McIntosh
Fort Mifflin
Fort Necessity
Fort Pitt
Fort Presque Isle
Fort Robert Smalls
Fort Roberdeau
Fort Venango

Puerto Rico
Fort Amezquita
Fort Buchanan, Puerto Rico
El Cañuelo
Fort San Cristóbal (Puerto Rico)
Fort San Felipe del Morro
Fortín de San Gerónimo
Fuerte de Vieques

Rhode Island

Fort Adams, open to the public
Fort Barton, open to the public
Fort Burnside, open to the public
Fort Church
Fort Dumpling, open to the public
Fort Getty, open to the public
Fort Greble
Fort Greene (1794), abandoned
Fort Greene (1943)
Fort Hamilton
Fort Kearny, open to the public
Fort Mansfield, open to the public
Fort Ninigret, open to the public
Queen's Fort, open to the public
Fort Varnum
Fort Wetherill, open to the public
Fort Wolcott, destroyed

South Carolina

The Battery
Fort Charlotte
Fort Fremont
Fort Howell
Fort Jackson
Fort Johnson
Fort Lyttleton
Fort Motte
Fort Moultrie
Old Ninety Six and Star Fort
Castle Pinckney
Fort Prince George
Fort Sumter
Fort Wagner
Fort Walker

South Dakota

Fort Bennett
Fort James, abandoned
Fort Meade, abandoned
Fort Randall, open to the public
Fort Sisseton, open to the public
Fort Sully, abandoned

Tennessee

Texas

The Alamo
Fort Bliss
Fort Brown
Fort Concho
Fort Crockett
Fort D. A. Russell
Fort Davis
Fort Hood
Fort Saint Louis
Fort San Jacinto
Fort Travis
Fort Worth

Utah
Fort Buenaventura
Cove Fort
Fort Cameron
Fort Deseret
Fort Douglas
Fort Duchesne
Fort Utah

Vermont

Virginia
Fort A.P. Hill
Fort Albany
Fort Boykin
Craney Island Fort
Fort Ethan Allen
Fort Eustis
Fort Huger
Fort Hunt
Fort John Custis
Fort Lee
Fort Loudoun
Fort Monroe
Fort Nelson
Fort Norfolk
Fort Myer
Fort Pickett
Fort Pocahontas
Fort Powhatan
Fort Richardson
Battery Rodgers
Fort Scott
Fort Story
Fort Ward
Fort Wool

Virgin Islands (U.S.)
Fort Christian
Fort Frederik
Fort Segarra

Washington
Fort Canby
Fort Casey, open to the public
Fort Columbia, open to the public
Fort Colville
Fort Dent
Fort Ebey
Fort Flagler
Fort George Wright
Camp Hayden, open to the public
Fort Lawton
Fort Lewis
Fort Nez Percés
Fort Nisqually, rebuilt as a living history museum
Fort Okanogan
Fort Simcoe, open to the public
Fort Spokane
Fort Townsend
Fort Vancouver, open to the public
Fort Walla Walla, open to the public
Fort Ward, open to the public
Fort Whitman
Fort Worden, open to the public

Washington, D.C.

Fort DeRussy
Fort McNair
Fort Stevens
Fort Totten, open to the public

West Virginia
Fort Ashby
Fort Milroy
Fort Pearsall
Prickett's Fort
Fort Randolph

Wisconsin
Fort Crawford
Fort Howard
Fort McCoy
Fort Shelby/Fort McKay
Fort Winnebago

Wyoming
Fort Bridger
Camp Brown
Fort Caspar
Fort D.A. Russell
Fort Fetterman
Fort Fred Steele
Fort Halleck
Fort Laramie
Fort Phil Kearny
Fort Platte
Fort Reno
Fort Sanders
Camp Stambaugh
Fort Supply
Fort Washakie
Fort Yellowstone

See also

List of forts (worldwide)
List of coastal fortifications of the United States
List of United States Army installations
List of fortifications
List of castles

References

Citations

Sources

Further reading

External links

 List of all US coastal forts and batteries at the Coast Defense Study Group
 American Forts Network, lists forts in the US, former US territories, Canada, and Central America
 FortWiki, lists most CONUS and Canadian forts
 US National Park Service list of parks with forts

Lists of buildings and structures in the United States
United States
United States military-related lists